List of football league clubs in the top four tiers of English football (i.e. the Premier League and the English Football League), as of the 2022–23 season, by year formed. To provide a consistent methodology, the year used is that published by the clubs themselves. Where month and day are also published, these are recorded in the notes.

Different sources offer alternative dates for club foundation dates, and the date attributed to a club can be disputed. Reasons for differences include:
Informal status: Clubs can originate as an unincorporated association; sources may include this relatively informal period as part of their history.
Mergers: Clubs can form by a merger of two clubs, with the date of one of the original clubs being selected as the foundation date.
Liquidation: Some clubs were liquidated, with a new club adopting the history of the liquidated club.
Historicity: Some dates are based on non-contemporary accounts with sources of uncertain provenance.
Continuity: Contemporary newspaper reports may give club names whose direct connection to modern-day clubs is not established.
Viewing a relocation as a foundation: This applies to MK Dons

Other listings of club foundation dates using different criteria are available.

References

History of football in the United Kingdom
year
year